Mike or Michael Findlay may refer to:

Michael Findlay (filmmaker) (1937–1977), American producer, director and screenwriter
Mike Findlay (born 1943), West Indian cricketer 
Michael Findlay (veterinary surgeon) (1944–2014), Scottish author and broadcaster
Michael Findlay (art expert) (born 1945), Scottish-American art dealer and author
Michael Findlay (soccer) (born 1963), Canadian soccer coach

See also
Mike Finley (1950–2020), American writer and videographer
Michael Finley (born 1973), American basketball player